Paul Hoffman is an American business writer. He was born in Chicago and holds A.B. and A.M. degrees from the University of Chicago. As a reporter for New York Post, he covered the New York courts for several years. His articles were also published in The New York Times, Saturday Review, Time, The Nation, and other periodicals.

Bibliography

References

External links
www.bestwebbuys.com
 NONFICTION IN BRIEF

American magazine editors
American business writers
Living people
University of Chicago alumni
New York Post people
20th-century American non-fiction writers
Writers from Chicago
Year of birth missing (living people)